Baxa is a Slavic surname. Notable people with the surname include:

 Karel Baxa (1863–1938), Czech politician
 María Baxa (1946–2019), Italian-Serbian actress
 Martin Baxa (born 1975), Czech politician
 Thomas Baxa (1946-2019), American artist

Slavic-language surnames